A lunar eclipse occurs whenever the moon passes behind the earth such that the earth blocks the suns rays from striking the moon.

Lunar Eclipse may also refer to:

Lunar Eclipse (album), an album by David Bryan from the band Bon Jovi
Lunar Eclipse (film), a 1999 Chinese film
"Lunar Eclipse" (Moonlighting), a series finale of Moonlighting

See also
List of lunar eclipses